Hipódromo, a Spanish and Portuguese word meaning "racecourse", may refer to:
Barrio Hipódromo, a populated place in Maldonado Department, Uruguay
Colonia Hipódromo Condesa, a neighborhood west of the historic center of Mexico City
Hipódromo, a populated place in Cerro Largo Department, Uruguay
Hipódromo, a neighbourhood in Asunción, Paraguay
Hipódromo, a sector of Santurce, San Juan, Puerto Rico
Jardines del Hipódromo, a neighbourhood in Montevideo, Uruguay
Jardines del Hipódromo Stadium, a sports venue in Montevideo, Uruguay

See also
Hippodrome (disambiguation)